Pamphylian may refer to:

Pamphylia, on the southern coast of Anatolia
Pamphylian Greek
Anatolian languages of Pamphylia:
 Pisidian language
 Sidetic language